Richard Restwold (1364 – c. 1423), of High Head Castle, Cumbria, Sindlesham, Berkshire and Crowmarsh Gifford, Oxfordshire, was an English politician.

He was a Member (MP) of the Parliament of England for Cumberland in 1419. He was the father of Richard Restwold, also an MP for Cumberland.

References

1364 births
1420s deaths
English MPs 1419
People from Cumberland
People from Winnersh
People from Oxfordshire